So Much More is the second studio album by the American singer-songwriter Brett Dennen. It has been ranked the number one folk download on iTunes.

In an issue of Rolling Stone following the release of the album, John Mayer commented, "He paints these gorgeous pictures musically." Dennen has toured with Mayer and opened for several of his concerts in 2006 and 2007.

Composition
So Much More's lyrics are mostly concerned with questioning the way things are. The album's tracks contain philosophical lyrics in which Dennen indicated that he asks questions but does not follow up by answering them.

Track listing
All songs were written by Brett Dennen.

Ain't No Reason - 3:39
There Is So Much More - 5:07
Darlin' Do Not Fear - 5:12
Because You Are a Woman - 4:12
She's Mine - 4:33
The One Who Loves You the Most - 5:01
I Asked When - 6:19
When You Feel It - 4:49
So Long Sweet Misery - 5:58
Someday - 3:50
Can't Slow Down (bonus track) - 5:41
Fig Tree (bonus track) - 5:26
Follow Your Heart (bonus track) - 2:52
Made for Better Things (bonus track) - 3:23

Personnel 
 Perla Batalla - vocals
 Mario Calire - drums
 Jim Christie - drums
 Luis Conte - percussion 
 Mark Goldenberg - electric guitar, ukulele, accordion
 Jennifer Grais - vocals
 Kevin McCormick - bass guitar
 Keb' Mo' - slide guitar
 Justin "El Niño" Porée - percussion
 Randy Schwartz - mandolin, drums, background vocals
 Scott Thurston - organ
 Brett Dennen - vocals, guitar, mandolin

References

2006 albums
Brett Dennen albums